The 2022–23 Ardal NW season (also known as the 2022–23 Lock Stock Ardal NW season for sponsorship reasons) is the second season of the new third-tier northern region football in Welsh football pyramid, part of the Ardal Leagues.

Teams
The league was made up of 16 teams competing for one automatic promotion place to Cymru North, whilst the second-placed team qualified for a play-off with the second-placed team of Ardal NE. Three teams are relegated to Tier 4.

On 21 September 2022, Rhydymwyn FC notified the Football Association of Wales of their withdrawal from the Ardal Leagues.  Announcing on Social Media, Rhydymwyn FC said: “Sad day today to announce Rhydymwyn FC & Rhydymwyn Development have resigned from @ArdalNorthwest and the Wales FA Reserve League. Our Juniors & mini teams will continue. Further statement from the club will be announced in due course.” 

Bodedern Athletic withdrew from the Ardal Leagues on 7 December 2022.  In a statement, Bodedern Athletic said: “A difficult decision has been made that Bodedern Athletic have withdrawn their membership of the Ardal North West League.
After a club meeting, the small group of volunteers running the club felt they had on option but to resign. The last couple of months have been difficult in trying to field a team, as many players have departed for various reasons, and not being able to sign players because of having transfer windows in Tier 3 of Welsh football. With no help or assistance from the League there was only one outcome.”

Team changes

To Ardal NW
Promoted from North East Wales Football League Premier Division
 Flint Mountain
 Hawarden Rangers

Promoted from North Wales Coast East Football League Premier Division
 C.P.D. Y Rhyl 1879

Promoted from North Wales Coast West Football League Premier Division
 Bodedern Athletic
 Bangor 1876

Relegated from Cymru North
 Llangefni Town

From Ardal NW
Promoted to Cymru North
 Mold Alexandra
 Porthmadog

Relegated
 St Asaph City
 Brymbo
 Blaenau Amateurs

Transferred to Ardal NE
 Llanuwchllyn

Stadia and locations

Source: Ardal NW Ground Information

Personnel

League table

Results

References

External links
Football Association of Wales
Northern Leagues

3
Ardal Leagues
Wales